The Tofalar (Тофалары, тофа (tofa) in Russian; formerly known as карагасы or Karagas) or Tofa people, are a Turkic people in the Irkutsk Oblast in Russia. Their ethnonym contains the Turkic plural suffix -lar, thus it means "Tofas". Their origins, Tofa language and culture are close to those of the eastern Tuvans-Todzhins. Before the 1917 October Revolution, the Tofalar used to be engaged in nomadic, living in the taiga; they engaged in reindeer husbandry and hunting. The Tofalar were resettled by the Soviet government by 1932. Young Tofas learned Russian at new Soviet-built schools, while cultural traditions such as hunting and shamanism were discouraged or prohibited. According to the 2010 census, there were 762 Tofas in Russia (2,828 in 1926, 476 in 1959, 570 in 1970, 576 in 1979, 722 in 1989 and 837 in 2002).

History 
Tofa people originated from the intermingling of various clans of Turkic, Mongolic, Yeniseian and Samoyedic origins. The original home of the Tofalar was on the slopes of the Sayan Mountains but they moved to their present location during the 17th century. The Tofalar were conquered by the Russians in the mid-seventeenth century and were required to pay the yasaq. Strong Russian influence in the region in the 18th and 19th centuries made the Tofas adopt many aspects of Russian culture, religion and language. The modern Tofalar are in danger of being assimilated by the Russians. They currently reside in Nizhneudinsky District within Irkutsk Oblast.

Culture 
Tofas used to be nomadic. Their economy included raising reindeer, trapping and hunting. Shamanism was vastly important to traditional Tofa culture and spirituality. Most Tofas are now settled.

External links

 The Red Book of the Peoples of the Russian Empire
 The Tof People, the Smallest Ethnic Group in the World

References

Turkic peoples of Asia
Ethnic groups in Russia
Indigenous peoples of North Asia
Indigenous small-numbered peoples of the North, Siberia and the Far East
Indigenous peoples in the Arctic
Irkutsk Oblast